Bokang Montjane (born 5 May 1986 in Transvaal) is a South African model and beauty pageant titleholder who was crowned Miss South Africa 2010, becoming the official representative of her country to the Miss Universe 2011 and Miss World 2011 pageants. She also participated in Miss International 2009 and placed in the Top 16 at Miss Earth 2007, finished as one of the Top 7 finalists and named Miss World Africa at Miss World 2011.

Early life
Montjane was born and raised in the village of Ga-Mphahlele in Northern Province (now Limpopo).
Prior to competing in Miss South Africa, Montjane participated in Miss Earth 2007 held in Quezon City, where she obtained the Beauty for a Cause award and placed as one of the Top 16 semifinalists of the competition. Two years later, she competed in Miss International 2009, in Chengdu, China.

Miss South Africa
She was the second African woman to compete in all Big Four pageants, after Cynthia Kanema of Zambia.

Montjane spoke to young people at the YCAP Nationals in 2019 to encourage them to engage and help within their own communities. She said: "You need to understand that when the time comes and you're in a position to make a difference, it's not about you. You are blessed to be a blessing. You guys are here, because you have answers to the problems that are taking place in your communities for a reason: because you're able and you're capable."

References

External links
Official Miss South Africa website

1986 births
Living people
Miss South Africa winners
Miss Universe 2011 contestants
Miss World 2011 delegates
Miss International 2009 delegates
Miss Earth 2007 contestants
People from Limpopo